Over Kellet is a civil parish in Lancaster, Lancashire, England. It contains 35 buildings that are recorded in the National Heritage List for England as designated listed buildings.  Of these, two are at Grade II*, the middle grade, and the others are at Grade II, the lowest grade. The parish contains the villages of Over Kellet and Capernwray, and is otherwise rural.  Most of the listed buildings are houses, farmhouses and associated structures.  The Lancaster Canal passes through the parish, and two bridges crossing it are listed.  The other listed buildings include a church, a chapel, two country houses, a public house, a derelict tower, and a village cross.

Key

Buildings

References

Citations

Sources

Lists of listed buildings in Lancashire
Buildings and structures in the City of Lancaster